Devarjan Dam, is an earthfill dam on Devari river near Udgir, Latur district in state of Maharashtra in India.

Specifications

Purpose
 Irrigation

See also
 Dams in Maharashtra
 List of reservoirs and dams in India

References

Dams in Latur district
Dams completed in 1993
1993 establishments in Maharashtra